Sport Select is a group of sports betting games offered by Canada's lottery corporations.  In Quebec, the program is known as Pari sportif; in Ontario and Atlantic Canada, it is known as Pro-Line while in British Columbia, it is known as Sports Action.  However, the rules for the games are similar in all provinces.  Initially created to offer betting primarily on the North American major professional sports leagues, Sport Select has expanded to offer betting on competitions such as the English Premier League and college sports.

Sport Select (or equivalent) tickets are sold across Canada, through Atlantic Lottery Corporation, Loto-Québec, Ontario Lottery and Gaming Corporation, Western Canada Lottery Corporation, and British Columbia Lottery Corporation.  In addition, some provinces are now accepting wagers over the Internet.

Sport Select games
Each province offers versions of these three games under rules similar to those described below:

Pro-Line
Known as Oddset in British Columbia and Mise-O-Jeu in Quebec, Pro-Line offers fixed-odds sports betting, and is the most popular Sport Select game.  It does not offer betting on individual matches, partly because betting on a single sporting event was illegal under the Criminal Code up until 27 August 2021.  Therefore, Pro-Line is a parlay game where bettors wager on the outcome of anywhere from two to six (BC and Atlantic) and three to six (Quebec, Ontario and Western Canada) of the matches offered by the lottery corporation.  Decimal odds are quoted for individual matches, the odds for each selection being multiplied to calculate the potential payout of the ticket.  For the ticket to pay out, all selections must be correct.  Some provinces offer Combo Play which does not require all selections to be correct for a payout, but a Combo Play ticket is effectively nothing more than a number of similar, individual Pro-Line tickets rolled into one.  Overtime is considered when determining results, but overtime in soccer is not. 

In June 2022, Proline sportsbook announced themselves as the first Sportsbook partner of Major League Baseball (MLB) in Ontario.

PROLINE+
On August 27 2021, the Ontario Lottery and Gaming Corporation (OLG) launched PROLINE+ to expand the sports betting selection in the province of Ontario. This coincided with the legalization of single-event betting in Canada, which opened the doors for provinces to start regulating and offering single-event betting as they wished. PROLINE+ is a mobile-optimized site that offers betting markets for at least 12 popular sports, including hockey, football, MMA, and tennis. Bettors can also bet live thanks to a built-in live event tracker.

Point spread
Point Spread is similar to those games offered by other bookmakers where bettors are wagering against a quoted point spread.  Bettors can make predictions on the outcomes of two to twelve games, depending on the province.  The payouts offered vary by province.

Over/Under
Also known as Total in Quebec, Over/Under is similar to those games offered by other bookmakers where bettors are wagering that the number of points scored in each match are over or under the quoted total.  Bettors can make predictions on the outcomes of two to twelve games, depending on the province.  The payouts offered vary by province.

Controversy

Odds

In recent years, Sport Select has come under increasingly heavy criticism from Canadian gamblers due to the poor odds it offers (from the gambler's perspective).  A private bookmaker licensed in the United Kingdom or Nevada generally maintains an overround (or "vig") of about 110%, meaning the bookmaker can expect to pay out $100 for every $110 that is wagered.  In Canada, however, the overround for an individual match in Sport Select odds often exceeds 130%.  To make matters worse for the bettor, the parlay requirement compounds the overround - the actual vigorish is a minimum of 160% but can climb to well over 300% (if six selections are made).  In jurisdictions such as the United Kingdom where genuine competition is allowed, bookies often pay bonuses for winning parlay bets to help offset the compounded vig.  Sport Select does not.

Another controversial frustration for Pro-Line players in Atlantic Canada is the occurrence of Atlantic Lottery (ALC) 'capping' wagering on combinations and, on rare occasion, individual selections.  This occurs when a significant amount of wagering is placed within a short span of time, typically on a specific combination of outcomes. The reasoning behind having such caps is to dissuade professional, or 'block', bettors from attempting to take advantage of potential flaws in the posted odds, and thus limits the liability for the corporation on a given combination of outcomes.  Typical block betting behaviour involves placing large sums (often thousands of $) on a very small amount of combinations, trying to focus on perceived flaws as much as possible.  Ultimately the Pro-Line game is meant to be recreational and not for professionals.  Unlike online-only betting operations where all transactions must be submitted by identity verified accounts, Atlantic Lottery operates across a network of retailers where wagers are accepted anonymously, thus making it more susceptible to such 'block' bettors.  The capping of combinations serves to limit pro-betting while keeping all outcomes open for betting, in any other combination.  If a combination of outcomes is capped, any subsequent transaction submitted to the system attempting to wager on this particular combination is rejected.  This can be an annoyance to non-professional (casual) bettors legitimately trying to wager on a capped combination, but experienced bettors have come to understand the reasoning and adjust their wagers accordingly.

Though most experts agree that the odds offered on Sport Select are such that even the sharpest punter would have no hope of making a profit in the long term, some have. See, for instance, the 2007 Tax Court of Canada case R. v. Leblanc, in which two brothers netted $5.5 million on $50 million in bets over five years. The Tax Court ruled the profit was not taxable.

Ties
While ties are a common in soccer and used to be common in ice hockey as well, unlike what would be the case with most bookmakers the rules of Sport Select provide for betting on "ties" in nearly every sport including football, basketball and in some provinces baseball, even though ties are never allowed in basketball or baseball and are rare in football.  Consequently, Sport Select mandates that any game decided by five points or less in basketball, three points or less in football or one run in baseball (where applicable) is declared a "tie".  Furthermore, when the NHL introduced shootouts in for the 2005–06 season the lottery corporations (in contrast to most bookmakers) quickly ruled that shootout results would not count, specifically so they could keep offering "ties" in hockey. In Ontario, a hockey game that goes to a shootout counts as both a Tie and a Visitor or Home win, depending on the outcome.  The rule is loathed by most Canadian gamblers because the size of the winning margin often means little to the teams on the field/court.  Many bettors believe the rule's true purpose is to confuse gamblers and allow for larger vigs.

NBA
Wagering on NBA games was an issue when Toronto and Vancouver were being considered for NBA expansion franchises, due to strict league rules at the time which prohibited gambling.  The Toronto Raptors and Vancouver Grizzlies began play in the league in 1995 only after the provincial lottery corporations agreed to stop offering wagering on all NBA games.  As part of the agreement, the Raptors paid $5 million in its first three years and $1 million annually afterwards to its charitable foundation to compensate the Ontario provincial lottery corporation for its loss of revenue.

When the Grizzlies relocated to Memphis in 2001, British Columbia resumed allowing wagering on NBA games.  In 2010, it was revealed that the Ontario Lottery Gaming Corporation and the Raptors were in negotiations to return wagering on NBA games to the province.  In September 2016, it was announced that an agreement had been reached between the parties to allow betting on NBA games on Pro-Line in Ontario to resume beginning with the 2016-17 season.  The move is projected to generate $5-10 million in profit for the province.

References

Lotteries in Canada
Sports betting